Waiouru Military Camp is a camp of the New Zealand Army in the central North Island of New Zealand near Waiouru.

All New Zealand Army soldiers complete their initial basic training, the All Arms Recruit Course (AARC), at Waiouru Military Camp. The camp is also the site of the army marae. The marae is the home of Ngati Tumatauenga, literally 'the tribe of the God of War', the Māori phrase for the New Zealand Army.

Military camp
The New Zealand government chose the sheep station at Waiouru as the location of a North Island training area for its Territorial Forces in the 1930s. The sheep station had large areas of inexpensive open land, and existing road and rail access to the North Island coastline. The artillery was the first branch of the New Zealand Army to use Waiouru. In 1937, Waiouru farmhand Cedric Arthur wrote:
The Military (artillery) Camp is here again for its annual big shoot, so Waiouru is exceedingly busy with huge lorries, tractors, guns and horses, not to mention soldiers galore.... It has been rumoured around here that the Minister of Defence has bought 15 miles of Waiouru to make a permanent Camp here. (Arthur 1984)

A month after the declaration of World War II in 1939, most of the leasehold Waiouru run was taken back by the Crown.

Wartime camp
At the beginning of the winter of 1940, 800 construction workers from the Ministry of Works built a training camp with capacity for 7,000 Territorial soldiers. Within six weeks 25,000 tons of building materials had arrived at Waiouru Railway Station. 450,000 tonnes of earth was shifted to make a flat area for the camp. At the same time, hundreds of soldiers camped under canvas in the snow and completed extensive field training.

By mid-1941, seven regimental camps housed 7,000 soldiers. There was a bakery, a hospital, two film theatres and five "institutes", each with a concert hall, library, writing room and tearooms. However, there were no bars; soldiers had to go to Taihape to buy a beer. An Armoured Fighting Vehicle School and a Command and Staff School at Waiouru were established in August 1941.

Postwar
More land was required for the camp by 1949. Plans were made to upgrade the Desert Road track through the artillery range to a major State Highway and build a high-voltage power line to transfer power up the Moawhango valley. The Army Schools at Trentham were to be transferred to Waiouru, compulsory military training was about to commence and, as defence responsibilities shifted to South-East Asia, the Army needed forests for jungle warfare training. These considerations resulted in another  of land to the north and east of the camp being acquired by the New Zealand Government. In 1955, the 1st NZSAS Squadron started jungle training in Paradise Valley, part of the newly acquired area.

Waiouru's busiest years
Compulsory military training was carried out at Waiouru from 1950 to 1958, and balloted national service from 1962 to 1972. In 1978, the National Army Museum opened at Waiouru, and in 1985 the Officer Cadet School of New Zealand. These were busiest years at Waiouru. 100 recreational clubs were active in the 1970s and 80s: the Ski Club alone had 300 members. At the time, Waiouru had a population of 6,000 people, including 600 children.

Declining use
In the 1980s some training was discontinued, and some army units were transferred to Linton. By 1990 Waiouru's permanent population had fallen to about 3,000. However, several hundred additional service personnel participated in training at Waiouru at any given time. In 1991, nearly three thousand soldiers were trained in Waiouru on 275 courses.

The 1,400 beds in the barracks were frequently full, with more personnel using satellite camps or sleeping in the field.

Waiouru continues to be the base for TAD (The Army Depot) and is the integral training base for the New Zealand Army. Most of the service people currently posted to Waiouru support training courses including the All Arms Recruit Course (basic training).

Future
In April 2004, regarding the future of the camp, Major General Jerry Mateparae stated that Waiouru was a strong factor in defining the Army, and the majority of courses, especially the more challenging ones, are run there. The camp also houses the School of Military Intelligence and Security for the New Zealand Intelligence Corps.

Defence Agreement with Singapore
As part of a memorandum of understanding signed between the Ministry of Defence (New Zealand) and the Ministry of Defence (Singapore) the live-firing range of the camp had been used by the Singapore Army for the test firing of their 155 mm howitzer guns—such as the FH-88, FH-2000, SLWH Pegasus and the SSPH Primus since 1985. On several occasions, Waiouru army camp has also hosted the visiting Singapore Army's artillery battalion during bi-lateral military training exercises.

Accidents

On 9 March 1997, a 155 mm artillery round exploded in the barrel of an FH-2000 howitzer during a live firing exercise conducted by the 23rd Battalion, Singapore Artillery, of the Singapore Army at the artillery range of Waiouru Army Camp. This resulted in the death of two full-time Singaporean national servicemen; Third Sergeant Ronnie Tan Han Chong and Lance Corporal Low Yin Tit. 12 other servicemen also were injured in the incident, including a Staff Sergeant from New Zealand Army, who was part of a group of New Zealand Defence Force liaison officer/observer to the visiting SAF battalion. The explosion was attributed to a defective fuse. The loading force of the round was found to be a contributing factor.

On 19 January 2019, while taking part in a live firing exercise as an Operationally Ready National Serviceman, Corporal First Class (CFC)(NS) Aloysius Pang entered the cabin of a Singapore Self-Propelled Howitzer (SSPH) to troubleshoot a fault. At 7.05 pm NZDT (2.05 pm SST), to enable diagnosis of the fault, the barrel of the howitzer was automatically lowered to neutral position within the cabin. Pang was in the path of the receding barrel and sustained severe crush injuries to his chest and abdomen as a result. Pang eventually succumbed to the sustained injuries and died at Waikato Hospital on 24 January 2019 at 1.45 am (NZDT UTC+13) (23 January 2019 8.45 pm SST UTC+8).

Royal New Zealand Navy
 
The Royal New Zealand Navy's Waiouru Wireless Telegraph Station was commissioned in July 1943 and at the height of the war had an establishment of about 150 personnel, of whom more than eighty were women. Tens of thousands of code groups were handled each day, mostly for the British Pacific Fleet in Japanese waters. A dozen or more circuits were manned simultaneously, and teleprinter land lines fed the signals to the Navy Office. In 1951, it was designated HMNZS Irirangi (Maori for spirit voice). It is now manned by only a small contingent of naval maintenance staff.

Waiouru Airfield
From World War II until 2001, the Royal New Zealand Air Force A-4 Skyhawks and Aermacchi MB-339 fighter jets used the Army's artillery target areas in the Rangipo Desert and east of the Moawhango River as bombing and rocket ranges. The RNZAF maintains Jameson Field inside the camp for its NH-90 and A-109 helicopters and practices landing Lockheed C-130 Hercules aircraft on the sealed Waiouru Airfield (ICAO Code NZRU) to the west of the camp.

Barracks 
The barracks in Waiouru are traditionally named after battles, campaigns and in one instance a war.

Alamein Barracks 
Alamein Barracks commemorate the 1942 Second Battle of El Alamein in which the 2nd New Zealand Division played a vital role.

Belhamed Barracks 
Belhamed Barracks commemorate the 2nd New Zealand Divisions actions at Belhamed during Operation Crusader in December 1941.

Bologna Barracks 
Bologna Barracks commemorate the Italian town of Bologna in Northern Italy which the 2nd New Zealand Division helped to liberate in 1945.

Cambrai Barracks 
Traditionally a Royal New Zealand Armoured Corps Barracks, Cambrai Barracks commemorate the 20 November 1917 Battle of Cambrai which was the first time that tanks were used en masse.

Cassino Barracks 
Cassino Barracks commemorate the 1944 Battle of Cassino.

Crete Barracks 
Crete Barracks commemorate the May 1941 Battle of Crete.

Faenza Barracks 
Faenza Barracks commemorate the December 1944 liberation of the Italian city of Faenza by the 2nd New Zealand Division. The NZ Division out flanked the German Garrison in Faenza, killing at least 200 Germans and capturing a further 300.

Galatas Barracks 
Galatas Barracks commemorate the New Zealand actions at Galatas during the Battle of Crete.

Gallipoli Barracks 
Gallipoli Barracks are named after the New Zealand's Army's first major campaign of the First World War.

Korea Barracks 
Korea Barracks commemorated the 4700 New Zealanders of Kayforce who served during the Korean War from 1950 to 1957.

Malaya Barracks 
Malaya Barracks commemorated New Zealand's contribution during the Malayan Emergency.

Maleme Barracks 
Maleme Barracks commemorate the New Zealand actions at Maleme during the Battle of Crete.

Megiddo Barracks 
Megiddo Barracks commemorated the 19–21 September 1918 Battle of Megiddo in which the New Zealand Mounted Rifle Brigade played a significant role.

Menastir Barracks 
Menastir Barracks commemorated the 2nd New Zealand Divisions actions in the Menastir area in December 1941.

Minqar Qaim Barracks 
Minqar Qaim Barracks commemorates the dramatic break out of the 2nd New Zealand Division when encircled by the German 21st Panzer Division.

Olympus Barracks 
Olympus Barracks commemorates the actions of the 5th Infantry Brigade (New Zealand) at Olympus Pass during the Greek Campaign of April 1941.

Platamon Barracks 
Platamon Barracks commemorates the actions of the 5th Infantry Brigade (New Zealand) at Platamon during the Greek Campaign of April 1941.

Ruweisat Barracks 
Ruweisat Barracks commemorated the 2nd New Zealand Divisions actions at Ruweisat Ridge area in July 1942.

Senio Barracks 
Senio Barracks commemorated one of those most difficult of operations - an opposed river crossing, when in April the 2nd New Zealand Division successfully crossed the Senio River in Italy during the Spring 1945 offensive in Italy.

Somme Barracks 
Somme Barracks commemorated the two WW1 Battles of the Somme, after which several New Zealand Infantry Battalions were granted the battle honour "Somme 1916-18".

Takrouna Barracks 
Takrouna Barracks commemorate the 2nd New Zealand Divisions last major action of World War IIs North African Campaign.

Tebaga Barracks 
Tebaga Barracks commemorate the 2nd New Zealand Divisions capture of the Tebaga Gap, opening up the road to the Mareth Line.

Terendak Barracks 
Terendak Barracks are named after the purpose built brigade camp in Malaysia that was occupied by the New Zealand Army from 1960 to 1969.

Trieste Barracks 
Trieste Barracks commemorate Trieste in northern Italy where the 2nd New Zealand Divisions ended it involvement in World War II and it is said fought the first battle of the Cold War

Vella Levella Barracks. 
Vella Levella Barracks commemorates the battle conducted by the 14th (New Zealand) Infantry Brigade of the 3rd New Zealand Division to secure Vella Levella in the central Solomon Islands.

See also 
Burnham, New Zealand
Hopuhopu Camp
Linton Military Camp
Papakura Military Camp
Trentham Military Camp

References
Notes

Bibliography

Arthur, P.M., 1984, Waiouru, Land of the Tussock, 1935–40.
Croom, F.G., 1941, The History of the Waiouru Military Camp.
Moss, G.R., 1956, The Waiouru Tussock Lands, NZ Journal of Agriculture, 16 July 1956.
Newspaper cutting, 1991, author and journal unknown.
Brief – Waiouru Land Acquisition, 1987, authors unknown.
A. Gregory, Weekend Herald, 24 December 2003

External links
NZDF website
New Zealand Army website

National Army Museum

Installations of the New Zealand Army
1939 establishments in New Zealand
Buildings and structures in Manawatū-Whanganui
Military installations established in the 1930s
Ruapehu District
Transport buildings and structures in Manawatū-Whanganui